Deoranian is a town and a nagar panchayat in Bareilly district  in the state of Uttar Pradesh, India.

Geography

Demographics
 India census, Deoranian had a population of 17,463. Males constitute 52% of the population and females 48%. Deoranian has an average literacy rate of 39%, lower than the national average of 59.5%: male literacy is 50% and, female literacy is 27%. In Deoranian, 19% of the population is under 6 years of age.

References

Cities and towns in Bareilly district